Lealailepule Rimoni Aiafi (born April 1967) is a Samoan politician and member of the Legislative Assembly of Samoa.  He is the founder of the Tautua Samoa Party.

Lealailepule was first elected to Parliament at the 2006 Samoan general election, representing the Faleata West (Faleata i Sisifo) as an independent. He had previously served as chief executive of the Samoan airport authority, and won election with 795 votes, 165 more than his rival, the former minister of police.

As an independent, Lealailepule campaigned against the planned government sale of the public broadcaster Radio 2AP. Since the formation of Tautua Samoa, he has also expressed doubts about the ability of the police commissioner to function in office following a damaging Commission of Inquiry Report, and called for the release on parole of former cabinet minister Toi Aukuso, jailed in the 1990s for the murder of Minister of Works Luagalau Levaula Kamu.

In November 2008, Lealailepule was one of twelve (later whittled down to nine) MPs from the Samoan opposition to form a new political party, Tautua Samoa. Like the other Tautua Samoa members, Lealailepule registered as an independent MP to avoid the constitutional requirement to contest a by-election on changing parties. The party was in January 2009 ordered to formally notify the Speaker of its existence and membership. Establishing the party, Lealailepule expressed his intention to form a stronger and more effective opposition to the ruling Human Rights Protection Party. In May 2009, Speaker Tolofuaivalelei Falemoe Lei'ataua revoked the parliamentary membership of all nine of the party's MPs, on the grounds that joining a party after being elected "breached the provisions of the Electoral Act and the parliament standing orders". The expulsion was later overturned by the courts.

In March 2010, Lealailepule was deemed to have resigned from Parliament under anti-party-hopping laws after refusing to deny his support for Tautua Samoa. He was defeated in the resulting by-election. He was re-elected at the 2011 election and appointed the Tautua Party's whip. During this term he opposed the creation of reserved seats for women and called for life imprisonment for drug smugglers.

In February 2016 he announced that he was leaving the Tautua Samoa party and would run as a Human Rights Protection Party candidate in the 2016 election. He was successfully re-elected, and appointed Associate Minister of Communications. As Associate Minister he accused the United Nations of promoting same-sex marriage and called for bloggers critical of the government to be hunted down.

Aiafi ran again at the 2021 election and was elected unopposed.

On 31 January 2022 Lealailepule was suspended from parliament for 24 hours for making "misleading" public comments about a parliamentary investigation into the passage of the Land and Titles Bill and the Speaker's refusal to swear in MPs elected under the women's quota following the 2021 Samoan by-elections.

On 23 March 2022 he was convicted alongside Tuila'epa Sa'ilele Malielegaoi of scandalising the court for his attacks on the judiciary during and following the 2021 Samoan constitutional crisis. On 24 May 2022 both were suspended indefinitely from the Legislative Assembly after the Privileges Committee found that they had bought parliament into disrepute.  On 30 August, the supreme court ruled the suspension to be unconstitutional.

Notes

References

External links
 

|-

|-

|-

1967 births
Living people
Members of the Legislative Assembly of Samoa
Tautua Samoa Party politicians
Human Rights Protection Party politicians